Tidikelt–Tuat Tamazight is a Glottolog classification that includes:

 Tidikelt language
 Tuwat language

References

Glottolog languages that correspond to more than one Wikipedia article